Yoeseltse Gewog (Dzongkha: འོད་གསལ་རྩེ་) is a gewog (village block) of Samtse District, Bhutan.

References

Gewogs of Bhutan
Samtse District